Devi Ahilya Vishwavidyalaya (informally abbreviated DAVV), formerly University of Indore, is a State University.
It was named after 'Ahilya Bai Holkar', the 18th century Queen and ruler of Indore, which was part of the Hindu Maratha Empire. Its jurisdiction was initially restricted to Indore city. Later on, its jurisdiction was extended to seven tribal-dominated districts of Indore division namely, Jhabua, Alirajpur, Dhar, Khargone, Khandwa, Burhanpur and Barwani. It is thus catering to the educational needs of the most industrially developed district of Madhya Pradesh, Indore on one hand and to the seven tribal and rural backward districts of the State on the other. DAVV is the only University in Madhya Pradesh accredited A+ Grade by NAAC.

History

Devi Ahilya Vishwavidyalaya formerly University of Indore was established in 1964 by an Act of Legislature of Madhya Pradesh. Dr. Zakir Hussain, then Vice President of India, inaugurated the university in 1964. The jurisdiction of the university was limited to Indore district.

In 1988, the university was renamed after the Holkar Maharani 'Devi Ahilya Bai Holkar' of the Maratha Empire as 'Devi Ahilya Vishwavidyalaya'. The word vishwavidyalaya is Hindi for university, thus, the university is called Devi Ahilya Vishwavidyalaya.

During reorganization of the universities, its jurisdiction was expanded over to Indore division, which spans over seven districts.

Campus
The university has its administrative offices and primary school campus on Rabindranath Tagore Marg in Indore. The Takshashila Campus on 139, Khandwa Road, Indra Puri Colony, Indore, Madhya Pradesh 452001 is an extension campus directly administered by the university. The university regulates all the schools within the three campuses. There are many other colleges affiliated to the university in Indore division.
The university has more than 300 affiliated colleges imparting education at under-graduate and post-graduate levels in basic and professional disciplines. The university has 9000 students in its campus and total over 300,000 students in affiliated colleges.

University spreads over an area of 760 acres in which academic classes holds in Takshila parisar (campus) of university which spreads over an area of 510 acres and Avanti parisar (campus) which spreads over 154 acres. Nalanda parisar (campus) is for administrative and official works which spreads over an area of 100 acres.

Recently Section 52 of the MP State Government Universities’ Act was applied on the university and the Vice Chancellor, Narendra Dhakad was removed due to gross mismanagement and corruption charges. A new Vice Chancellor Renu Jain, has been appointed in his place.

Academics
Every college in university teaching department is autonomous.

Conventional courses
During the initial stages of its development 1964–1984, university established
conventional School of Studies in Physics, Mathematics, Statistics, and Chemistry.  It
was one of the first few universities to start B.Ed. in 1968 and MBA in 1969. It later
started Life Sciences, Economics, Biochemistry and Journalism.

Self-supporting courses
University is one of the first in starting as early as 1991 the experiment of self-supporting courses in order to have partial support for the development of
infrastructure.  This experiment has certainly made a positive impact on the overall
development of the university both in terms of employment opportunities on one side
and students needs on the other.

Engineering courses and medical courses
The Engineering and Technology (I.E.T.) Institute of Engineering and Technology, DAVV has started functioning since 1996 and now runs number of B.E. and M.E. courses. The admissions in I.E.T. is held through Madhya Pradesh Pre-Engineering Test (M.P.P.E.T.), which will be further altered in 2014 under which admissions will be held on the basis of all India ranking in Joint Entrance Exam (J.E.E.). University also runs medical and dental colleges.

Excellent and special assistance programme
UGC has granted SAPs to School of Education, School of Economics, School of Life
Sciences and School of Physics in the university.

Excellence in Information Technology and Applications
Previous work: University made another big stride during 1998-2002 by establishing campus wide fiber network and Internet facilities throughout the educational and administrative campuses of the university.  It is the best I.T. Centre in the central part of the country. M.Sc. (Information Technology) and M.Tech. (Embedded Systems) were also started during this period.
Recent Initiatives :  University has initiated major thrust from Aug. 2006 for it is installing LCD Projectors and Internet access points in all class rooms,  e-management of the university,  e-submission of fees and forms by the students,  Wi-Fi Campus and Hostels, e-grant of migration and eligibility certificates to students and establishment of e-record room.
It is expected that this move will mitigate student hard ship in getting administrative services from University and facilitate its employees to work with latest Computers, Servers and Internet.

Innovations
University is first in the state of Madhya Pradesh in innovation and has made a name in
country for (a) Courses in Computer Science, Information Technology, Management and
Engineering Sciences (Energy Management, Laser Optics, Instrumentation, Futures Studies, Technology Management, Data Sciences) (b) Its research work in fields of Education, Life Sciences, Physics,
Economics and Chemistry and (c) Excellent Centers for Electronic Media, Adult
Education and Information Technology.

Central library
The university library was established in the year 1964 along with the establishment of the university. The university library caters to the information needs of the academic community. The university library started the Bachelor of Library and Information Science Program from the 1993–94 year, as a part-time course, with its goals to train the manpower to manage the libraries of the 21st century. The library has over 200,000 books.

Organisation and administration

Institutes
 School of Data Science and Forecasting (SDSF)
 School of Pharmacy (SOP)
 Academic Staff College
 Bahá'í Chair for Studies in Development
 Centre for Science Communication
 Centre for e-Business
 Centre for Lifelong Learning
 Department of Adult / Continuing Education & Extension
 Department of Student Welfare (DSW)
 Directorate of Distance Education
 Educational Multimedia Research Centre
 Information & Communication Technology Centre
 Institute of Engineering & Technology (IET)
 Institute of Management Studies (IMS)
 International Institute of Professional Studies
 School of Advanced Liberal Studies
 School of Anthropology
 School of Biochemistry
 School of Biotechnology
 School of Chemical Science
 School of Commerce
 School of Comparative Language & Culture
 School of Computer Science And Information Technology (SCSIT)
 School of Economics (SOE)
 School of Education
 School of Energy and Environmental Studies (SEES)
 School of Electronics
 School of Futures Studies and Planning (FSP)
 School of Journalism And Mass Communication 
 School of Law
 School of Life Sciences
 School of Instrumentation
 School of Social Sciences(SOSS)
 School of Statistics(SoSt)

Center of potential of excellence in e management studies
Devi Ahilya Vishwavidyalaya is one of the first few universities which started the MBA course as early as in 1969.  Devi Ahilya Vishwavidyalaya is also one of the first few universities which started the computer center and computer courses of MCA and M.Sc. Computer Science in the country as early as 1986. Management and computer schools of studies are known in the country for their new initiatives during last 25 years. They are also known for starting several innovative courses first time in the country.
University has also taken one of the first few initiatives in the country in 1998 for setting an Information Technology Center (ITC) with fiber backbone spread all over the campuses and advanced the then fast switches and router based network. ITC has been completed with the provision of high speed Internet access and best of the computing resources for the university students, faculty, research scholars and staff round the clock.
UGC have selected DAVV as Centre with Potential for Excellence in e management studies.

Information technology center
IT Centre was established in the year 2000 to create a campus-wide network by interconnecting various campuses and departments. First phase which was completed in April 2001, networked 18 departments having 524 nodes. Second phase was completed in Oct 2002, which connected ten more departments and installed 331 additional nodes.
Under UGC-INFONET scheme, from Jan 2004, UGC has provided university free subscription to the various e-journals along with 2 Mbit/s bandwidth through ERNET. Internet access is provided to all departments using fibre optic backbone & 16 Mbit/s leased line.

University cultural center
The university auditorium was inaugurated on 30 September 2005 by Dr. Balram Jakhar, Governor, M.P. The auditorium is available for use by DAVV members, governments, and statutory bodies, national, regional, international and other recognized institutions. The auditorium is not available for any political or commercial activity. The decision of vice chancellor in this matter shall be final.
The auditorium has two levels, accommodating 1100 seats in the balcony and the main hall. Stairs to the east and west provide access to the balcony.

School of Law
DAVV through its law faculty, School of Law has bestowed India and especially Madhya Pradesh with many legal illuminaries in all fields such as litigation, activists, corporate officers etc. SOL (School of Law) is one amongst the oldest and most recognized law schools in Indore and amongst top law schools in state. Its meritorious students have held its name high and are well placed in judicial services, public sector and private sector.

Research
Apart from specialized schools of studies university also conducts several research works with assistance of UGC. For this university have a separate committee of deans which suggest ways to streamline the entire process of Ph.D. thesis evaluation mechanism.
The university have established a Sodha Peeth on Devi Ahilya to motivate research on regional issues. New postgraduate degree programmes in research on their lines of IITs/Central universities are envisaged.

Student life

Gyanvani FM Radio
Gyanvani FM Radio was established in June 2006. It delivers educational content through radio to cross-segment of the society.

Gyanvani is an educational FM radio station broadcasting in several cities of India. Gyanvani stations operate as media cooperative with day-to-day programmes being contributed by educational institutions, NGOs, government and semi-government organizations, UN agencies, ministries such as Agriculture, Environment, Health, Women and Child Welfare, Science & Technology etc. besides national-level institutions such as NCERT, NIOS and State Open Universities.

Gyanvani, Indore is an educational FM radio station at 105.6 MHz on the premises of EMRC, Devi Ahilya Vishwavidhalaya, Indore in collaboration with IGNOU, New Delhi. The radio station broadcasts educational programs covering all fields of education. Students are involved in the production and broadcasting of radio programs.

Notable alumni

 General Manoj Mukund Naravane
 Lieutenant General Gurmit Singh
 Sumitra Mahajan
 Tulsi Silawat
 Aavriti Choudhary
 Siddhartha Paul Tiwari 
 Satish Modh 
 Shubhangi Atre
 Ibrahim Ashk 
 Gaurav Arora
 Paridhi Sharma 
 Ranjana Baghel 
 Kailash Vijayvargiya
 Zameer Uddin Shah
 Jitu Patwari
 Bala Bachchan
 Meenakshi Natarajan 
 Akash Vijayvargiya
 Kennedy Mong'are Okong'o
 Lieutenant General Vinod G. Khandare

External links
 Devi Ahilya Vishwavidyalaya on MPOnline Portal

References

Universities and colleges in Indore
Educational institutions established in 1964
Buildings and structures in Indore
1964 establishments in Madhya Pradesh